The Yellow Album is The Simpsons second album of originally recorded songs, released as a follow-up to the 1990 album The Simpsons Sing the Blues. Though it was released in 1998, it had been recorded years earlier, after the success of the first album. The title is a play on the name of the Beatles' self-titled 1968 album, commonly known as "The White Album", with the skin color of the characters of The Simpsons. In addition, the cover is a parody of the Beatles' 1967 album, Sgt. Pepper's Lonely Hearts Club Band.

The parody was also used for a couch gag in Season 8 Simpsons episodes "Bart After Dark" and "The Itchy & Scratchy & Poochie Show" (until it was replaced in reruns of the latter episode with the couch gag from "Kamp Krusty", where the Simpsons find the Flintstones on their couch and Fred invites Homer to sit with him). A similar version of it is on the inside of the United Kingdom version of The Simpsons Season 9 DVD. An outtake named "My Name Is Bart" is a parody of musician Prince's 1992 single "My Name Is Prince". In 1993, it was also reported that Matt Groening had penned a rap song to be performed by Bart.

James L. Brooks, producer of the show, wanted to produce a follow-up album based on the popular reception of the debut, but creator Matt Groening was against it. The cast then recorded The Yellow Album, but it was not released until 1998, at which time it suffered poor reception. The album was to be released in February 1993 and feature Prince, Linda Ronstadt, and C+C Music Factory. Plans were in the works for music videos to accompany The Yellow Album.

Production
Greg Haver cowrote and produced "Ten Commandments of Bart".

Album artwork
The Yellow Album cover artwork, illustrated by Bill Morrison (although signed by Matt Groening), is a parody of the cover art for the Beatles album Sgt. Pepper's Lonely Hearts Club Band, replaced with characters from The Simpsons.

In 2005, the artist and designer Kaws (commissioned by Nigo) created The Kaws Album, a "traced interpretation" of The Yellow Album. In 2019, Sotheby's auction house in Hong Kong sold The Kaws Album for 115.9 million Hong Kong dollars, or about $14.7 million U.S. dollars, a new auction record for the artist at the time. Yellow Album artist Bill Morrison felt "ripped off" by this, re-igniting a conversation about the appropriation of commercial illustrations for fine art (see Roy Lichtenstein).

Critical reception

There was some hype leading up to the release of the album. Entertainment Weekly writer David Browne said he "eagerly await[ed]" it in March 1993, a month before it was set to be released.

Nevertheless, the album received mixed to negative reviews. The Star-Telegram compared the album to the South Park album Chef Aid, arguing that "the subversion [included in The Simpsons and South Park] is only skin-deep, especially when both shows thrive on the type of money-grubbing merchandising that results in junk like Chef Aid: The South Park Album and The Simpsons The Yellow Album, both released just in time for Christmas." The Tampa Bay Times said the album "is an uninspired collection whose best feature is a too-tiny takeoff on the cover of Sgt. Pepper's Lonely Hearts Club Band," noting that songs such as "Ten Commandments of Bart" sounded dated, though others like "Sisters Are Doin' It for Themselves" are praiseworthy.

Track listing

"My Name Is Bart" is a bonus track only found on promotional copies of the album.

References

External links
 

The Simpsons albums
1998 soundtrack albums
Geffen Records albums
Television animation soundtracks
Albums with cover art by Matt Groening